Brick is the second album by the Atlanta, Georgia-based band Brick.

Samples
"Fun" has been sampled by India Arie on her song "Video" from her 2001 album Acoustic Soul and Da Brat on the song "Live it Up" from her 1996 album Anuthatantrum. "Living from the Mind" has been sampled by En Vogue on the song "No No No (Can't Come Back)" from their 2000 album Masterpiece Theatre. "Ain't Gonna' Hurt Nobody" was sampled by Kid 'n Play in the song of the same name which was featured on their 1991 album Face the Nation, in their hit 1991 film House Party 2, and on its accompanying soundtrack.

Track listing
Ain't Gonna' Hurt Nobody - (Ray Ransom)  3:54
Living From The Mind - (Ray Ransom)  3:36
Happy - (Jimmy "Lord" Brown, Ray Ransom, Eddie Irons)  4:23
We Don't Wanna' Sit Down (We Wanna' Git Down) - (Donald Nevins, Jimmy "Lord" Brown, Ray Ransom, Eddie Irons, Regi Hargis)  5:41
Dusic - (Jimmy "Lord" Brown, Ray Ransom, Regi Hargis)   5:44
Hello - (Eddie Irons, Ray Ransom, Jimmy "Lord" Brown)  3:35
Honey Chile - (Donald Nevins, Jimmy "Lord" Brown, Ray Ransom, Eddie Irons) 4:53
Fun - (Regi Hargis)  3:33
Good Morning Sunshine - (Jimmy "Lord" Brown)  3:36

Personnel
Jimmy "Lord" Brown - Saxophone, Flute, Trombone, Trumpet, Vocals
Donald Nevins - Keyboards, Vocals
Ray Ransom - Bass, Vocals
Eddie Irons - Drums, Vocals
Regi Hargis - Guitar, Vocals

Charts

Singles

See also
List of number-one R&B albums of 1977 (U.S.)

References

External links
 Brick-Brick at Discogs

1977 albums
Bang Records albums
Brick (band) albums